dios (malos) is an album by the band of the same name, dios (malos).  It was released by Vagrant Records on October 11, 2005.

Track listing 

 "Feels Good Being Somebody" - 3:15
 "Say Anything" - 4:22
 "I Want It All" - 2:45
 "So Do I" - 5:08
 "EPK" - 5:52
 "Tokyo Sunrise" - 3:10
 "Grrrl" - 2:45
 "No Dance Now" - 3:18
 "I Feel Fine All the Time" - 3:16
 "My Broken Bones" - 6:28
 "Later Skater" - 4:13
 "Old Field Recordings" - 6:48

The band formed in 1999 and began practicing in Songwriter Joel Morales' fathers house in Inglewood, California. The group was originally named simply "dios", but due to a legal threat from Ronnie James Dio changed their name to "dios (malos)" in 2004.

Current members of the band are:
 John Paul Caballero (bass)
 Jimmy Cabeza DeVaca (keyboards)
 Patrick Butterworth (drums)
 Joel Morales (guitar, vocals)
 Edwin Kampwirth (keyboards)

References

External links 
 dios malos: Clearly California
 Album Review: Dios (Malos) - Dios (Malos)
 dios malos: MySpace page
 dios malos: Official Website

2005 albums